Clemens Andreas Rapp (born 14 July 1989 in Weingarten) is a German swimmer. He competed at the 2012 Summer Olympics in the 200 m freestyle, finishing in 24th place in the heats, failing to qualify for the semifinals. His team was placed fourth in the 4 × 200 m freestyle relay.

He won a silver and a gold medal in the 4 × 200 m freestyle relay at the European championships in 2010 and 2012, respectively.

At the 2016 Summer Olympics in Rio de Janeiro, he competed in the 400 m freestyle, finishing 24th in the heats and failing to qualify for the semifinals. He also competed on the  freestyle relay team which finished in 6th place.

He was born to Manfred and Doris Rapp and has a sister Magdalena and a brother Matthias.

References

External links
 
 
 
 
 

1989 births
Living people
People from Weingarten, Württemberg
Sportspeople from Tübingen (region)
German male swimmers
Olympic swimmers of Germany
Swimmers at the 2012 Summer Olympics
Swimmers at the 2016 Summer Olympics
German male freestyle swimmers
European Aquatics Championships medalists in swimming
20th-century German people
21st-century German people